Trois Couleurs (Three Colors) is a Paris-based monthly magazine that focuses on culture, cinema and technology. It is edited by the French broadcasting group MK2, and its title pays tribute to the trilogy "Three Colors" of Krzysztof Kieślowski. It is distributed only in Paris: in MK2 movie theaters, the Fnac network of Paris, and in 250 cultural places, restaurants, bars, concert halls, and museums. Trois Couleurs reaches 600,000 readers with a total circulation of 200,000.

Most of the content is dedicated to cinema and to the promotion of independent films with interviews of directors, such as Jim Jarmusch and Frederick Wiseman.

The editorial policy claims to analyze complicated cultural phenomenon in a simple way in order to suit a readership as wide as can be.

History 
At first, Trois Couleurs was only dedicated to the current affairs of MK2 movie theaters. In 2007, editor Elisha Karmitz reshaped the magazine and widened the editorial policy in order to make a proper cultural magazine out of Trois Couleurs. Thus, it was a perfect illustration of a consumer turning into a media. Moreover, an extension of the distribution systems to 250 cultural places, restaurants, bars, concert halls and museums in Paris accompanied this change.

The 50th issue of Trois Couleurs was the first issue published into the reshaped form: there were only 56 pages. The magazine claimed to share an independent look at trends and news in the cultural sector which was conveyed by topics like « Cult Scene », which gave the audience to read a scene which changed the way of making movies. Therefore, the editorial staff offered a very subjective and personal analysis of film and cultural events: for example, it always gave « 3 reasons to see [a] movie ». Thus, Trois Couleurs strengthened its relationship with the readership : the readers were in fact very important to the editorial policy, so a page was dedicated to the publication of pieces of art related to cinema drawn by some of the readers.

Trois Couleurs  developed a practical approach of the events. Besides, the magazine became influent due to the broadcasting of videos of concerts, interviews and documentaries. The editorial staff flew to Detroit to shoot a documentary on Motown Records and directed the video of a concert of Mos Def at Élysée Montmartre in 2007 which was broadcast on Dailymotion. They repeated the experience with a concert of the Wu-Tang Clan in 2008.

In 2009, Trois couleurs put on weight  and widened its editorial policy: an urban lifestyle guide was added, featuring the best cultural spots in Paris. Then, Trois couleurs claimed to be a prescriber for cultural and urban lifestyle. The magazine got also a new logo  which was more aesthetic and charismatic and inspired of urban culture. 
In December 2009, Trois Couleurs launched his first special issue, which focused on the counterculture of the 1960s and invited Hedi Slimane to be guest editor-in-chief. Trois Couleurs was the first free French media to charge for collector issues. Although the monthly magazine talked about news and events, special issues put a cultural corpus into perspective depending on three axis: a thematic approach, a portfolio and several discussions with artists. The first special issue was successful, a fact which fostered the editorial staff to edit a new one when Tom Dicillo’s documentary on The Doors was released.

The special issues were often related to historical events: for example, an issue was dedicated to the Stanley Kubrick exhibition of the Cinémathèque Française in 2011. Trois Couleurs also edited a special issue in 2012 when the movie « On The road » (based on Jack Kerouac’s novel) was released and which is particularly relevant of the spirit of the magazine because it was built around the problematic «The man. The book. The film. » which allowed them to dedicate the contents to the process of creation.

In April 2011, the editorial staff shot a 75 minutes documentary about hackism which was directed by one of its editors for the French channel « France 4 ». Then, Trois Couleurs met an ex-contributor to WikiLeaks and hacktivists of Anonymous before it became famous. Furthermore, this legitimated Trois Couleurs''' role of prescriber. The documentary was entitled « Pirat@ges » and got several good reviews. During the Festival de Cannes 2011, Trois Couleurs launched a reshaped form of the magazine, which meant 132 pages. Étienne Rouillon, who was editor in chief on the special issue "Games Stories"  and director of « Pirat@ges » became editor in chief of the whole magazine in 2012.

 Policy 
The aim of Trois Couleurs is to do alternative press in order to suit a readership as wide as can be the audience of a movie theater; moreover, its editorial policy is to always try to analyze complicated cultural phenomenon in a simple way and to open elitist production in the fields of culture, music and cinema to the largest audience they can get.

In order to suit its readership, Trois Couleurs favours storytelling in the writing of its articles, like in the special issue called "Games Stories", released in 2011 to accompany the eponymous exhibition at the Grand Palais.

Nevertheless, the magazine keeps a very classical tone and form, so its name is relevant to explain the dialectical construction of its articles. Indeed, a topic is dealt with three levels analysis: 
 
The analysis of the new perspectives in art field opened by the release of a project
The analysis of its feedback
The analysis of it becoming a phenomenon

 Circulation 
The target of Trois Couleurs Magazine consists in 60% of women, 50% of 15-34 years old people, 40% of middle-class people and 75% of Parisians. The magazine reaches 600,000 readers with a total circulation of 200,000, with MK2’s movie theaters being responsible for 70% of the total circulation.

 Layout 

 First part of the magazine 

The first pages focus on the news of the month to go, as an echo to the following pages dedicated to cinema. These are set sections, whom the most important are: 
 Be kind, rewind: this section puts into perspective a lately released movie and one of the same inspiration or dedicated to the same theme
 Tendency: while a theme is put on the top of the news because of the broadcasting of a movie, Trois Couleurs analyzes it and backs it with a video corpus
 Crosswords: the editorial staff asks someone well-known to comment some paragraphs and quotes from a literary work which is related to the project that person is releasing.
 An eye for an eye: this short section analyzes the similarities between a film broadcast in movie theaters and an oldest one
  Curriculum vitæ : two pages are dedicated to those who operate behind the scenes, by detailing the curriculum vitae of technical experts, concept designers and experts in programming.
 Study Case: the editorial staff gives the pros and cons of a movie which is debatable
 Investigation File: the editorial staff analyzes a trendy topic during 3 pages
 Sex Tape''': an article focusing on eroticism in a cultural production

Central Pages 

They focus on cinema and highlight neglected cinematographic phenomenon. The contents also gather interviews of actors and directors who are related to a recently broadcast movie. All of the monthly released movies are deciphered according to a personal and subjective look.

Store 

These pages present the movies, CDs, books, exhibitions, and video games that the redaction loved.

Guide 

This is the last part of the magazine, which develops a practical approach of the Parisian lifestyle thanks to a guide listing the best concerts, bars and exhibitions of the month. It also introduces the events released by the MK2 movie theaters and shows a comic strips of Dupuy and Berberian.

References

External links
 

2002 establishments in France
Cultural magazines
French-language magazines
Magazines established in 2002
Magazines published in Paris
Monthly magazines published in France
Women's magazines published in France